Hemileuca peigleri, the Texas buck moth, is a moth in the family Saturniidae.

Description
The male abdomen is black with a red tip, and the female abdomen is solid black. Their wings are almost transparent, with the upper side of the wing being gray with narrow black borders and a black wing base. Each wing has a wide white band with a small eyespot. Their wingspan ranges from 5.8 – 8.2 cm.

Range
Their range covers central Texas.

Habitat
Their habitat consists of oak-covered hills.

Ecology
Adult moths of this species do not feed. Female Texas buck moths fly 10–20 feet above the ground within oak trees while males fly near the ground.

Hosts of the Texas buck moth include Texas live oak (Quercus fusiformis), Havard's oak (Q. havardii), Shumard's oak (Q. shumardii), and Nuttall oak (Q. texana).

Etymology

Taxonomy
Hemileuca peigleri is at times considered a subspecies of Hemileuca maia, but many authors consider it its own species.

References

Hemileucinae
Moths of North America
Lepidoptera of the United States
Endemic fauna of Texas